William Furby (1 May 1869 – 1949) was an English amateur footballer who played for Southampton St. Mary's in the club's first season in the Southern League.

Football career
Furby was one of several players from Staffordshire who joined St. Mary's in 1894. His first recorded match was at centre-half in a Hampshire County Cricket Club Charity Cup tie on 18 April – he retained his place for the remaining two matches in this tournament including the final against Royal Artillery five days later, when he scored in a 5–0 victory.

Although he was an adaptable half-back and a good crosser of the ball, during the inaugural Southern League season, Furby's first-team opportunities were restricted due to the form of Ernie Taylor and Lachie Thomson. After only five league and two FA Cup outings, he left the "Saints" to join arch-rivals Freemantle.

References

1869 births
1949 deaths
Footballers from Staffordshire
English footballers
Association football defenders
Southampton F.C. players
Freemantle F.C. players
Southern Football League players